K2-296b (more commonly referred to as EPIC 201238110 b) is a planet discovered by Heller et al. in 2019. There is another candidate planet in the system called EPIC 201238110 c.

Habitability 
It has been classed as a warm superterran.

References 

Exoplanets discovered by K2
Exoplanets discovered in 2019
Exoplanets in the habitable zone
Transiting exoplanets